Charlotte Adigéry, also known as WWWater, is a Belgian musician.

Early life and education
Adigéry was born in France and grew up in Ghent, Belgium.  She is of Martinican and Guadeloupian descent. Her family background is Nigerian Yoruban via the Martinique slave trade. Adigéry attended college in Hasselt, where she studied music.

Career
In 2016, Adigéry contributed vocals to "The Best Thing" a song on the 2016 Belgica film soundtrack that was scored by David and Stephen Dewaele, aka Soulwax or 2ManyDJs.

In 2017, Adigéry released a self-titled four-song EP on DEEWEE. The record features Adigéry singing in English, French and Créole. It was written and produced with and by Bolis Pupul and mixed by the Dewaele brothers.

In 2019, Adigéry released an EP called Zandoli that was written and produced by Bolis Pupul and co-produced plus mixed by Stephen and David Dewaele from Soulwax and was released on the record label DEEWEE. She sings in Creole on the first track called "Paténipat". The song was featured in the trailer for the John Malkovich 2020 HBO TV series, The New Pope. As part of the promotion of Zandoli, Adigéry did a Take Away Show which was shot at the Pete the Monkey Festival in July 2019 by La Blogothèque.

In 2019, Adigéry released a limited to 300 edition cassette single called Yin Yang Self-Meditation on DEEWEE made with frequent collaborator Bolis Pupul and the Dewaele brothers. Adigéry uses stream of consciousness to explore racism, writing music, and what it means to be an artist.

Adigéry also records under the moniker WWWater, a project which is more raw and punk.

Adigéry has toured with Neneh Cherry.

Honors
 2019: The NME 100: Essential new artists for 2019
 2019: Focus Knack, Human of the Year
 2019: Music Industry Awards: Breakthrough, Alternative and Artwork (nominee)
 2020: Music Moves Europe Talent Awards, (nominee)
 2023:  Music Industry Awards: Producer and Artwork.

Discography

WWWater
 2017: La Falaise EP (self-released)

Charlotte Adigéry
 2017: Charlotte Adigéry EP (DEEWEE)
 2019: Zandoli EP (DEEWEE)
 2019: Yin Yang Self-Meditation limited edition cassette (DEEWEE)
 2022: Topical Dancer with Bolis Pupul (DEEWEE)

Collaborations
 2016: Belgica film soundtrack, "The Best Thing" by Soulwax – vocals

References

Living people
People from Narbonne
Belgian women pop singers
21st-century Belgian women singers
21st-century Belgian singers
English-language singers from Belgium
Belgian electronic musicians
French emigrants to Belgium
Women in electronic music
Year of birth missing (living people)
Yoruba women musicians
Belgian people of Yoruba descent
Belgian people of Martiniquais descent
Belgian people of Guadeloupean descent